The South African Railways Class 16D 4-6-2 of 1925 was a steam locomotive.

In 1925, the South African Railways placed two American-built Class 16D locomotives with a  Pacific type wheel arrangement in passenger train service. Five more of these locomotives were ordered and placed in service in 1926.

Manufacturer
On 15 December 1924, after an official tour of investigation to the United States of America by G.E. Titren, the Superintendent Motive Power of the South African Railways (SAR), an order was placed with the Baldwin Locomotive Works of Philadelphia for four experimental locomotives, two of which were of a 4-6-2 Pacific type wheel arrangement. These locomotives were all delivered in 1925. The two Pacifics were designated Class 16D and numbered 860 and 861.

The two Mountain types, which arrived from the same builders in the same shipment, were designated Class 15C. The Classes 16D and 15C were specially designed for working the Union Limited (Johannesburg to Cape Town) and Union Express (Cape Town to Johannesburg) passenger trains, the forerunners of the Blue Train.

Characteristics
These locomotives conformed to SAR requirements as far as practicable but also incorporated the latest American railway engineering practices. The engines introduced several features which were new to the SAR at the time, such as top feeds to the boiler, self-cleaning smokeboxes, Sellar's drifting valves, and grease lubrication to the coupled wheel axle boxes, crank pins and connecting rod big ends.

The locomotive's size quickly earned it the nickname Big Bertha, while its contemporary Class 15C locomotive was nicknamed Big Bill. The first two Pacifics were followed by another five locomotives from the same manufacturer in 1926, numbered in the range from 862 to 866.

The boilers were equipped with three Coale pop type safety valves and Schmidt type superheaters. Their fireboxes were equipped with flexible side stays and water siphon arch tubes to support the brick arch and to improve circulation.

Modifications
Considerable improvements were effected on the Class 16D after they entered service. During 1941, all seven engines had their coupled wheels retyred from  diameter.

When larger tyres were fitted, the old tyres were left in position and turned down on the wheel centres to serve as liners and the new tyres were then shrunk on over the liners. The practice of increasing the diameter of coupled wheels, wheel spacing and other considerations permitting, was begun by A.G. Watson during his term in office as Chief Mechanical Engineer and was continued by his successors. The reduction of tractive effort caused by the larger wheels was made up by increasing boiler pressures or by fitting larger cylinders or both, as required. This practice resulted in more mileage between heavy repairs, less cost-per-mile on repairs and locomotives capable of higher speeds.

In the Western Cape, wheatland fires caused by locomotives were a huge problem for farmers as well as for the SAR who had to pay out the claims. In the late 1960s Johannes Barnard, the assistant locomotive superintendent at Cape Town, invented a self-cleaning smokebox and a way to blow char out of the smokebox when the engine was standing in non-sensitive places such as at water stops. While on the run, excess char was diverted into a box mounted below the smokebox door. The consensus among railwaymen at the time was that these modifications were not entirely effective, but they remained in use for at least ten years nonetheless.

Service
The introduction of these large engines, along with their Class 15C  Mountain type Big Bill siblings, resulted in a complete revision of traffic operation between Cape Town and Johannesburg.

On the return journey, no. 860 took the Union Express over from Big Bill no. 2060 at Beaufort West and hauled it all the way back to Johannesburg.

This continuous run by one locomotive set up a world record. Prior to this, it was customary to use three engines on the Cape Town run of these two named trains with engine changes at Kimberley and Beaufort West. On ordinary trains, up to six locomotives were often used with engine changes at Klerksdorp, Kimberley, De Aar, Beaufort West and Touws River.

Upon the arrival of larger locomotives, the Class 16D was later transferred to Bloemfontein in the Orange Free State, from where they worked north to Johannesburg. In 1939 they were relocated to Cape Town from where they hauled fast local commuter trains to Wellington and Malmesbury for the remainder of their careers. The Klawer Mail passenger train from Cape Town was one of the last reasonably respectable duties for the Baldwin Pacifics. By 1971, the days of the Class 16D in passenger service were numbered and service on goods trains and pick-up workings predominated. They were withdrawn from service in 1972.

Preservation

Illustration

References

1920
4-6-2 locomotives
2′C1′ h4 locomotives
Baldwin locomotives
Cape gauge railway locomotives
Railway locomotives introduced in 1925
1925 in South Africa